Caesar Augustus (born Gaius Octavius; 23 September 63 BC – 19 August AD 14), also known as Octavian, was the first Roman emperor; he reigned from 27 BC until his death in AD 14. He is known for being the founder of the Roman Principate, which is the first phase of the Roman Empire, and is considered one of the greatest leaders in human history. The reign of Augustus initiated an imperial cult as well as an era associated with imperial peace, the Pax Romana or Pax Augusta. The Roman world was largely free from large-scale conflict for more than two centuries despite continuous wars of imperial expansion on the empire's frontiers and the year-long civil war known as the "Year of the Four Emperors" over the imperial succession.

Originally named Gaius Octavius, he was born into an old and wealthy equestrian branch of the plebeian gens Octavia. His maternal great-uncle Julius Caesar was assassinated in 44 BC, and Octavius was named in Caesar's will as his adopted son and heir; as a result, he inherited Caesar's name, estate, and the loyalty of his legions. He, Mark Antony and Marcus Lepidus formed the Second Triumvirate to defeat the assassins of Caesar. Following their victory at the Battle of Philippi (42 BC), the Triumvirate divided the Roman Republic among themselves and ruled as de facto dictators. The Triumvirate was eventually torn apart by the competing ambitions of its members; Lepidus was exiled in 36 BC, and Antony was defeated by Octavian at the Battle of Actium in 31 BC.

After the demise of the Second Triumvirate, Augustus restored the outward façade of the free republic, with governmental power vested in the Roman Senate, the executive magistrates and the legislative assemblies, yet he maintained autocratic authority by having the Senate grant him lifetime tenure as commander-in-chief, tribune and censor. A similar ambiguity is seen in his chosen names, the implied rejection of monarchical titles whereby he called himself Princeps Civitatis (First Citizen) juxtaposed with his adoption of the title augustus.

Augustus dramatically enlarged the empire, annexing Egypt, Dalmatia, Pannonia, Noricum and Raetia, expanding possessions in Africa, and completing the conquest of Hispania, but he suffered a major setback in Germania. Beyond the frontiers, he secured the empire with a buffer region of client states and made peace with the Parthian Empire through diplomacy. He reformed the Roman system of taxation, developed networks of roads with an official courier system, established a standing army, established the Praetorian Guard as well as official police and fire-fighting services for Rome, and rebuilt much of the city during his reign. Augustus died in AD 14 at age 75, probably from natural causes. Persistent rumors, substantiated somewhat by deaths in the imperial family, have claimed his wife Livia poisoned him. He was succeeded as emperor by his adopted son Tiberius, Livia's son and also former husband of Augustus' only biological daughter Julia.

Name 
As a consequence of Roman customs, society, and personal preference, Augustus was known by many names throughout his life:
 Gaius Octavius. According to Suetonius, the cognomen Thurinus was added to his birth name as a toddler in 60 BC. Later, after he had taken the name of Caesar, his rival Mark Antony referred to him as "Thurinus" in order to belittle him. In response, he merely said he was surprised that "using his old name was thought to be an insult".
 Gaius Julius Caesar Octavianus. He took the name of his adoptive father, Julius Caesar, but was often distinguished from him as "Octavianus", the adjectival form of "Octavius". He is mainly known by the anglicization "Octavian" for the period between 44 and 27 BC.
 Imperator Caesar. Octavian's early coins and inscriptions all refer to him simply as Gaius Caesar, but by 38 BC he had replaced "Gaius" with the victory title imperator ("commander").
 Imperator Caesar Augustus. On 16 January 27 BC, partly on his own insistence, the Roman Senate granted him the surname Augustus. Historians use this name to refer to him from 27 BC until his death in AD 14.

Early life 

He was born at Ox Head, a small property on the Palatine Hill, very close to the Roman Forum. He was given the name Gaius Octavius, and in his childhood he received the cognomen Thurinus, possibly commemorating his father's victory at Thurii over a rebellious band of slaves which occurred a few years after his birth. Suetonius wrote: "There are many indications that the Octavian family was in days of old a distinguished one at Velitrae; for not only was a street in the most frequented part of town long ago called Octavian, but an altar was shown there besides, consecrated by an Octavius. This man was leader in a war with a neighbouring town ..."

Due to the crowded nature of Rome at the time, Octavius was taken to his father's home village at Velletri to be raised. Octavius mentions his father's equestrian family only briefly in his memoirs. His paternal great-grandfather Gaius Octavius was a military tribune in Sicily during the Second Punic War. His grandfather had served in several local political offices. His father, also named Gaius Octavius, had been governor of Macedonia. His mother, Atia, was the niece of Julius Caesar.

His father died in 59 BC when he was four years old. His mother married a former governor of Syria, Lucius Marcius Philippus. Philippus claimed descent from Alexander the Great and was elected consul in 56 BC. Philippus never had much of an interest in young Octavius. Because of this, Octavius was raised by his grandmother, Julia, the sister of Julius Caesar. Julia died in 52 or 51 BC, and Octavius delivered the funeral oration for his grandmother. From this point, his mother and stepfather took a more active role in raising him. He donned the toga virilis ("toga of manhood") four years later and was elected to the College of Pontiffs in 47 BC. The following year he was put in charge of the Greek games that were staged in honor of the Temple of Venus Genetrix, built by Julius Caesar.

According to Nicolaus of Damascus, Octavius wished to join Caesar's staff for his campaign in Africa but gave way when his mother protested. In 46 BC, she consented for him to join Caesar in Hispania, where he planned to fight the forces of Pompey, Caesar's late enemy, but Octavius fell ill and was unable to travel. When he had recovered, he sailed to the front but was shipwrecked. After coming ashore with a handful of companions, he crossed hostile territory to Caesar's camp, which impressed his great-uncle considerably. Velleius Paterculus reports that after that time, Caesar allowed the young man to share his carriage. When back in Rome, Caesar deposited a new will with the Vestal Virgins, naming Octavius as the prime beneficiary.

Rise to power

Heir to Caesar 

Octavius was studying and undergoing military training in Apollonia, Illyria, when Julius Caesar was assassinated on the Ides of March (15 March) 44 BC. He rejected the advice of some army officers to take refuge with the troops in Macedonia and sailed to Italy to ascertain whether he had any potential political fortunes or security. Caesar had no living legitimate children under Roman law and so had adopted Octavius, his grand-nephew, making him his primary heir. Mark Antony later charged that Octavian had earned his adoption by Caesar through sexual favours, though Suetonius describes Antony's accusation as political slander. This form of slander was popular during this time in the Roman Republic to demean and discredit political opponents by accusing them of having an inappropriate sexual affair. After landing at Lupiae near Brundisium, Octavius learned the contents of Caesar's will, and only then did he decide to become Caesar's political heir as well as heir to two-thirds of his estate.

Upon his adoption, Octavius assumed his great-uncle's name Gaius Julius Caesar. Roman citizens adopted into a new family usually retained their old nomen in cognomen form (e.g., Octavianus for one who had been an Octavius, Aemilianus for one who had been an Aemilius, etc.). However, though some of his contemporaries did, there is no evidence that Octavius officially used the name Octavianus, as it would have made his modest origins too obvious. Historians usually refer to the new Caesar as Octavian during the time between his adoption and his assumption of the name Augustus in 27 BC in order to avoid confusing the dead dictator with his heir.

Octavian could not rely on his limited funds to make a successful entry into the upper echelons of the Roman political hierarchy. After a warm welcome by Caesar's soldiers at Brundisium, Octavian demanded a portion of the funds that were allotted by Caesar for the intended war against the Parthian Empire in the Middle East. This amounted to 700 million sesterces stored at Brundisium, the staging ground in Italy for military operations in the east. A later senatorial investigation into the disappearance of the public funds took no action against Octavian since he subsequently used that money to raise troops against the Senate's arch enemy Mark Antony. Octavian made another bold move in 44 BC when, without official permission, he appropriated the annual tribute that had been sent from Rome's Near Eastern province to Italy.

Octavian began to bolster his personal forces with Caesar's veteran legionaries and with troops designated for the Parthian war, gathering support by emphasizing his status as heir to Caesar. On his march to Rome through Italy, Octavian's presence and newly acquired funds attracted many, winning over Caesar's former veterans stationed in Campania. By June, he had gathered an army of 3,000 loyal veterans, paying each a salary of 500 denarii.

Growing tensions 

Arriving in Rome on 6 May 44 BC, Octavian found consul Mark Antony, Caesar's former colleague, in an uneasy truce with the dictator's assassins. They had been granted a general amnesty on 17 March, yet Antony had succeeded in driving most of them out of Rome with an inflammatory eulogy at Caesar's funeral, mounting public opinion against the assassins.

Mark Antony was amassing political support, but Octavian still had the opportunity to rival him as the leading member of the faction supporting Caesar. Antony had lost the support of many Romans and supporters of Caesar when he initially opposed the motion to elevate Caesar to divine status. It is alleged that Antony refused to handover the money due Octavian as Caesar's adopted heir, however Ronald Syme casts doubt on this saying that 'invective asserts and history repeats' such a fact. During the summer, he managed to win support from Caesarian sympathizers and also made common with the optimates, the former enemies of Caesar, who saw him as the lesser evil and hoped to manipulate him. In September, the leading optimate orator Marcus Tullius Cicero began to attack Antony in a series of speeches portraying him as a threat to the republican order.

First conflict with Antony 
With opinion in Rome turning against him and his year of consular power nearing its end, Antony attempted to pass laws that would assign him the province of Cisalpine Gaul. Octavian meanwhile built up a private army in Italy by recruiting Caesarian veterans, and on 28 November he won over two of Antony's legions with the enticing offer of monetary gain.

In the face of Octavian's large and capable force, Antony saw the danger of staying in Rome and, to the relief of the Senate, he left Rome for Cisalpine Gaul, which was to be handed to him on 1 January. However, the province had earlier been assigned to Decimus Junius Brutus Albinus, one of Caesar's assassins, who now refused to yield to Antony. Antony besieged him at Mutina and rejected the resolutions passed by the Senate to stop the fighting. The Senate had no army to enforce their resolutions. This provided an opportunity for Octavian, who already was known to have armed forces. Cicero also defended Octavian against Antony's taunts about Octavian's lack of noble lineage and aping of Julius Caesar's name, stating "we have no more brilliant example of traditional piety among our youth."

At the urging of Cicero, the Senate inducted Octavian as senator on 1 January 43 BC, yet he also was given the power to vote alongside the former consuls. In addition, Octavian was granted imperium pro praetore (commanding power) which legalized his command of troops, sending him to relieve the siege along with Hirtius and Pansa (the consuls for 43 BC).  He assumed the fasces on 7 January, a date that he would later commemorate as the beginning of his public career. Antony's forces were defeated at the battles of Forum Gallorum (14 April) and Mutina (21 April), forcing Antony to retreat to Transalpine Gaul. Both consuls were killed, however, leaving Octavian in sole command of their armies.

The Senate heaped many more rewards on Decimus Brutus than on Octavian for defeating Antony, then attempted to give command of the consular legions to Decimus Brutus. In response, Octavian stayed in the Po Valley and refused to aid any further offensive against Antony. In July, an embassy of centurions sent by Octavian entered Rome and demanded the consulship left vacant by Hirtius and Pansa and also that the decree should be rescinded which declared Antony a public enemy. When this was refused, he marched on the city with eight legions. He encountered no military opposition in Rome and on 19 August 43 BC was elected consul with his relative Quintus Pedius as co-consul. Meanwhile, Antony formed an alliance with Marcus Aemilius Lepidus, another leading Caesarian.

Second Triumvirate

Proscriptions 

In a meeting near Bologna in October 43 BC, Octavian, Antony, and Lepidus formed the Second Triumvirate. Their powers were officialized by the Senate on 27 November. This explicit arrogation of special powers lasting five years was then legalised by law passed by the plebs, unlike the unofficial First Triumvirate formed by Pompey, Julius Caesar, and Marcus Licinius Crassus. The triumvirs then set in motion proscriptions, in which between 130 and 300 senators and 2,000 equites were branded as outlaws and deprived of their property and, for those who failed to escape, their lives. This decree issued by the triumvirate was motivated in part by a need to raise money to pay the salaries of their troops for the upcoming conflict against Caesar's assassins, Marcus Junius Brutus and Gaius Cassius Longinus. Rewards for their arrest gave incentive for Romans to capture those proscribed, while the assets and properties of those arrested were seized by the triumvirs.

Contemporary Roman historians provide conflicting reports as to which triumvir was most responsible for the proscriptions and killing. However, the sources agree that enacting the proscriptions was a means by all three factions to eliminate political enemies. Marcus Velleius Paterculus asserted that Octavian tried to avoid proscribing officials whereas Lepidus and Antony were to blame for initiating them. Cassius Dio defended Octavian as trying to spare as many as possible, whereas Antony and Lepidus, being older and involved in politics longer, had many more enemies to deal with. This claim was rejected by Appian, who maintained that Octavian shared an equal interest with Lepidus and Antony in eradicating his enemies. Suetonius said that Octavian was reluctant to proscribe officials but did pursue his enemies with more vigor than the other triumvirs. Plutarch described the proscriptions as a ruthless and cutthroat swapping of friends and family among Antony, Lepidus, and Octavian. For example, Octavian allowed the proscription of his ally Cicero, Antony the proscription of his maternal uncle Lucius Julius Caesar (the consul of 64 BC), and Lepidus his brother Paullus.

Battle of Philippi and division of territory 

On 1 January 42 BC, the Senate posthumously recognized Julius Caesar as a divinity of the Roman state, divus Iulius. Octavian was able to further his cause by emphasizing the fact that he was divi filius, "Son of the Divine". Antony and Octavian then sent 28 legions by sea to face the armies of Brutus and Cassius, who had built their base of power in Greece. After two battles at Philippi in Macedonia in October 42, the Caesarian army was victorious and Brutus and Cassius committed suicide. Mark Antony later used the examples of these battles as a means to belittle Octavian, as both battles were decisively won with the use of Antony's forces. In addition to claiming responsibility for both victories, Antony branded Octavian as a coward for handing over his direct military control to Marcus Vipsanius Agrippa instead.

After Philippi, a new territorial arrangement was made among the members of the Second Triumvirate. Gaul and the province of Hispania were placed in the hands of Octavian. Antony traveled east to Egypt where he allied himself with Queen Cleopatra, the former lover of Julius Caesar and mother of Caesar's son Caesarion. Lepidus was left with the province of Africa, stymied by Antony, who conceded Hispania to Octavian instead.

Octavian was left to decide where in Italy to settle the tens of thousands of veterans of the Macedonian campaign, whom the triumvirs had promised to discharge. The tens of thousands who had fought on the republican side with Brutus and Cassius could easily ally with a political opponent of Octavian if not appeased, and they also required land. There was no more government-controlled land to allot as settlements for their soldiers, so Octavian had to choose one of two options: alienating many Roman citizens by confiscating their land, or alienating many Roman soldiers who could mount a considerable opposition against him in the Roman heartland. Octavian chose the former. There were as many as eighteen Roman towns affected by the new settlements, with entire populations driven out or at least given partial evictions.

Rebellion and marriage alliances 

There was widespread dissatisfaction with Octavian over these settlements of his soldiers, and this encouraged many to rally at the side of Lucius Antonius, who was brother of Mark Antony and supported by a majority in the Senate. Meanwhile, Octavian asked for a divorce from Claudia, the daughter of Fulvia (Antony's wife) and her first husband Publius Clodius Pulcher. He returned Claudia to her mother, claiming that their marriage had never been consummated. Fulvia decided to take action. Together with Lucius Antonius, she raised an army in Italy to fight for Antony's rights against Octavian. Lucius and Fulvia took a political and martial gamble in opposing Octavian, however, since the Roman army still depended on the triumvirs for their salaries. Lucius and his allies ended up in a defensive siege at Perusia (modern Perugia), where Octavian forced them into surrender in early 40 BC.

Lucius and his army were spared because of his kinship with Antony, the strongman of the East, while Fulvia was exiled to Sicyon. Octavian showed no mercy, however, for the mass of allies loyal to Lucius; on 15 March, the anniversary of Julius Caesar's assassination, he had 300 Roman senators and equestrians executed for allying with Lucius. Perusia also was pillaged and burned as a warning for others. This bloody event sullied Octavian's reputation and was criticized by many, such as Augustan poet Sextus Propertius.

Sextus Pompeius, the son of Pompey and still a renegade general following Julius Caesar's victory over his father, had established himself in Sicily and Sardinia as part of an agreement reached with the Second Triumvirate in 39 BC. Both Antony and Octavian were vying for an alliance with Pompeius. Octavian succeeded in a temporary alliance in 40 BC when he married Scribonia, a sister or daughter of Pompeius's father-in-law Lucius Scribonius Libo. Scribonia gave birth to Octavian's only natural child, Julia, the same day that he divorced her to marry Livia Drusilla, little more than a year after their marriage.

While in Egypt, Antony had been engaged in an affair with Cleopatra and had fathered twin children with her. Aware of his deteriorating relationship with Octavian, Antony left Cleopatra; he sailed to Italy in 40 BC with a large force to oppose Octavian, laying siege to Brundisium. This new conflict proved untenable for both Octavian and Antony, however. Their centurions, who had become important figures politically, refused to fight because of their Caesarian cause, while the legions under their command followed suit. Meanwhile, in Sicyon, Antony's wife Fulvia died of a sudden illness while Antony was en route to meet her. Fulvia's death and the mutiny of their centurions allowed the two remaining triumvirs to effect a reconciliation.

In the autumn of 40, Octavian and Antony approved the Treaty of Brundisium, by which Lepidus would remain in Africa, Antony in the East, Octavian in the West. The Italian Peninsula was left open to all for the recruitment of soldiers, but in reality this provision was useless for Antony in the East. To further cement relations of alliance with Antony, Octavian gave his sister, Octavia Minor, in marriage to Antony in late 40 BC.

War with Sextus Pompeius 

Sextus Pompeius threatened Octavian in Italy by denying shipments of grain through the Mediterranean Sea to the peninsula. Pompeius's own son was put in charge as naval commander in the effort to cause widespread famine in Italy. Pompeius's control over the sea prompted him to take on the name Neptuni filius, "son of Neptune". A temporary peace agreement was reached in 39 BC with the Pact of Misenum; the blockade on Italy was lifted once Octavian granted Pompeius Sardinia, Corsica, Sicily, and the Peloponnese, and ensured him a future position as consul for 35 BC.

The territorial agreement between the triumvirate and Sextus Pompeius began to crumble once Octavian divorced Scribonia and married Livia on 17 January 38 BC. One of Pompeius's naval commanders betrayed him and handed over Corsica and Sardinia to Octavian. Octavian lacked the resources to confront Pompeius alone, so an agreement was reached with the Second Triumvirate's extension for another five-year period beginning in 37 BC.

In supporting Octavian, Antony expected to gain support for his own campaign against the Parthian Empire, desiring to avenge Rome's defeat at Carrhae in 53 BC. In an agreement reached at Tarentum, Antony provided 120 ships for Octavian to use against Pompeius, while Octavian was to send 20,000 legionaries to Antony for use against Parthia. Octavian sent only a tenth of those promised, which Antony viewed as an intentional provocation.

Octavian and Lepidus launched a joint operation against Sextus in Sicily in 36 BC. Despite setbacks for Octavian, the naval fleet of Sextus Pompeius was almost entirely destroyed on 3 September by General Agrippa at the naval battle of Naulochus. Sextus fled to the east with his remaining forces, where he was captured and executed in Miletus by one of Antony's generals the following year. As Lepidus and Octavian accepted the surrender of Pompeius's troops, Lepidus attempted to claim Sicily for himself, ordering Octavian to leave. Lepidus's troops deserted him, however, and defected to Octavian since they were weary of fighting and were enticed by Octavian's promises of money.

Lepidus surrendered to Octavian and was permitted to retain the office of pontifex maximus (head of the college of priests) but was ejected from the Triumvirate. His public career at an end, he effectively was exiled to a villa at Cape Circei in Italy. The Roman dominions were divided between Octavian in the West and Antony in the East. Octavian ensured Rome's citizens of their rights to property in order to maintain peace and stability in his portion of the empire. This time, he settled his discharged soldiers outside of Italy, while also returning 30,000 slaves to their former Roman owners—slaves who had fled to join Pompeius's army and navy. Octavian had the Senate grant him, his wife, and his sister tribunal immunity, or sacrosanctitas, in order to ensure his own safety and that of Livia and Octavia once he returned to Rome.

War with Antony and Cleopatra 

Meanwhile, Antony's campaign turned disastrous against Parthia, tarnishing his image as a leader, and the mere 2,000 legionaries sent by Octavian to Antony were hardly enough to replenish his forces. On the other hand, Cleopatra could restore his army to full strength; he already was engaged in a romantic affair with her, so he decided to send Octavia back to Rome. Octavian used this to spread propaganda implying that Antony was becoming less than Roman because he rejected a legitimate Roman spouse for an "Oriental paramour". In 36 BC, Octavian used a political ploy to make himself look less autocratic and Antony more the villain by proclaiming that the civil wars were coming to an end and that he would step down as triumvir—if only Antony would do the same. Antony refused.

Roman troops captured the Kingdom of Armenia in 34 BC, and Antony made his son Alexander Helios the ruler of Armenia. He also awarded the title "Queen of Kings" to Cleopatra, acts that Octavian used to convince the Roman Senate that Antony had ambitions to diminish the preeminence of Rome. Octavian became consul once again on 1 January 33 BC, and he opened the following session in the Senate with a vehement attack on Antony's grants of titles and territories to his relatives and to his queen.

The breach between Antony and Octavian prompted a large portion of the senators, as well as both of that year's consuls, to leave Rome and defect to Antony. However, Octavian received two key deserters from Antony in the autumn of 32 BC: Munatius Plancus and Marcus Titius. These defectors gave Octavian the information that he needed to confirm with the Senate all the accusations that he made against Antony. Octavian forcibly entered the temple of the Vestal Virgins and seized Antony's secret will, which he promptly publicized. The will would have given away Roman-conquered territories as kingdoms for his sons to rule and designated Alexandria as the site for a tomb for him and his queen. In late 32 BC, the Senate officially revoked Antony's powers as consul and declared war on Cleopatra's regime in Egypt.

In early 31 BC, Antony and Cleopatra were temporarily stationed in Greece when Octavian gained a preliminary victory: the navy successfully ferried troops across the Adriatic Sea under the command of Agrippa. Agrippa cut off Antony and Cleopatra's main force from their supply routes at sea, while Octavian landed on the mainland opposite the island of Corcyra (modern Corfu) and marched south. Trapped on land and sea, deserters of Antony's army fled to Octavian's side daily while Octavian's forces were comfortable enough to make preparations.

Antony's fleet sailed through the bay of Actium on the western coast of Greece in a desperate attempt to break free of the naval blockade. It was there that Antony's fleet faced the much larger fleet of smaller, more maneuverable ships under commanders Agrippa and Gaius Sosius in the Battle of Actium on 2 September 31 BC. Antony and his remaining forces were spared by a last-ditch effort from Cleopatra's fleet that had been waiting nearby.

Octavian pursued them and defeated their forces in Alexandria on 1 August 30 BC—after which Antony and Cleopatra committed suicide. Antony fell on his own sword and was taken by his soldiers back to Alexandria where he died in Cleopatra's arms. Cleopatra died soon after, reputedly by the venomous bite of an asp or by poison. Octavian had exploited his position as Caesar's heir to further his own political career, and he was well aware of the dangers in allowing another person to do the same. He therefore followed the advice of Arius Didymus that "two Caesars are one too many", ordering Caesarion killed while sparing Cleopatra's children by Antony, with the exception of Antony's older son. Octavian had previously shown little mercy to surrendered enemies and acted in ways that had proven unpopular with the Roman people, yet he was given credit for pardoning many of his opponents after the Battle of Actium.

Sole ruler of Rome 

After Actium and the defeat of Antony and Cleopatra, Octavian was in a position to rule the entire republic under an unofficial principate—but he had to achieve this through incremental power gains. He did so by courting the Senate and the people while upholding the republican traditions of Rome, appearing that he was not aspiring to dictatorship or monarchy. Marching into Rome, Octavian and Agrippa were elected as consuls by the Senate.

Years of civil war had left Rome in a state of near lawlessness, but the republic was not prepared to accept the control of Octavian as a despot. At the same time, Octavian could not give up his authority without risking further civil wars among the Roman generals, and even if he desired no position of authority his position demanded that he look to the well-being of the city of Rome and the Roman provinces. Octavian's aims from this point forward were to return Rome to a state of stability, traditional legality, and civility by lifting the overt political pressure imposed on the courts of law and ensuring free elections—in name at least.

First settlement 

On 13 January 27 BC, Octavian made a show of returning full power to the Roman Senate and relinquishing his control of the Roman provinces and their armies. Under his consulship, however, the Senate had little power in initiating legislation by introducing bills for senatorial debate. Octavian was no longer in direct control of the provinces and their armies, but he retained the loyalty of active duty soldiers and veterans alike. The careers of many clients and adherents depended on his patronage, as his financial power was unrivaled in the Roman Republic. Historian Werner Eck states:

To a large extent, the public was aware of the vast financial resources that Octavian commanded. He failed to encourage enough senators to finance the building and maintenance of networks of roads in Italy in 20 BC, but he undertook direct responsibility for them. This was publicized on the Roman currency issued in 16 BC, after he donated vast amounts of money to the aerarium Saturni, the public treasury.

According to historian H. H. Scullard, however, Octavian's power was based on the exercise of "a predominant military power and ... the ultimate sanction of his authority was force, however much the fact was disguised." The Senate proposed to Octavian, the victor of Rome's civil wars, that he once again assume command of the provinces. The Senate's proposal was a ratification of Octavian's extra-constitutional power. Through the Senate, Octavian was able to continue the appearance of a still-functional constitution. Feigning reluctance, he accepted a ten-year responsibility of overseeing provinces that were considered chaotic. The provinces ceded to Augustus for that ten-year period comprised much of the conquered Roman world, including all of Hispania and Gaul, Syria, Cilicia, Cyprus, and Egypt. Moreover, command of these provinces provided Octavian with control over the majority of Rome's legions.

While Octavian acted as consul in Rome, he dispatched senators to the provinces under his command as his representatives to manage provincial affairs and ensure that his orders were carried out. The provinces not under Octavian's control were overseen by governors chosen by the Roman Senate. Octavian became the most powerful political figure in the city of Rome and in most of its provinces, but he did not have a monopoly on political and martial power. The Senate still controlled North Africa, an important regional producer of grain, as well as Illyria and Macedonia, two strategic regions with several legions. However, the Senate had control of only five or six legions distributed among three senatorial proconsuls, compared to the twenty legions under the control of Octavian, and their control of these regions did not amount to any political or military challenge to Octavian. The Senate's control over some of the Roman provinces helped maintain a republican façade for the autocratic principate. Also, Octavian's control of entire provinces followed republican-era precedents for the objective of securing peace and creating stability, in which such prominent Romans as Pompey had been granted similar military powers in times of crisis and instability.

Change to Augustus

On 16 January 27 BC the Senate gave Octavian the titles of augustus and princeps. Augustus is from the Latin word augere (meaning to increase) and can be translated as "the illustrious one". It was a title of religious authority rather than political authority. His name of Augustus was also more favorable than Romulus, the previous one which he styled for himself in reference to the story of the legendary founder of Rome, which symbolized a second founding of Rome. The title of Romulus was associated too strongly with notions of monarchy and kingship, an image that Octavian tried to avoid. The title princeps senatus originally meant the member of the Senate with the highest precedence, but in this case it became an almost regnal title for a leader who was first in charge. The name augustus was inherited by all future emperors, eventually becoming, at least in practice, the main title of the emperor. As a result, modern historians usually regard this event as the beginning of Augustus' reign as "emperor". Augustus also styled himself as Imperator Caesar divi filius, "Commander Caesar son of the deified one". With this title, he boasted his familial link to deified Julius Caesar, and the use of imperator signified a permanent link to the Roman tradition of victory. He transformed Caesar, a cognomen for one branch of the Julian family, into a new family line that began with him.

Augustus was granted the right to hang the corona civica (civic crown) above his door and to have laurels drape his doorposts. However, he renounced flaunting insignia of power such as holding a scepter, wearing a diadem, or wearing the golden crown and purple toga of his predecessor Julius Caesar. If he refused to symbolize his power by donning and bearing these items on his person, the Senate nonetheless awarded him with a golden shield displayed in the meeting hall of the Curia, bearing the inscription virtus, pietas, clementia, iustitia—"valor, piety, clemency, and justice."

Second settlement 

By 23 BC, some of the un-republican implications were becoming apparent concerning the settlement of 27 BC. Augustus's retention of an annual consulate drew attention to his de facto dominance over the Roman political system and cut in half the opportunities for others to achieve what was still nominally the preeminent position in the Roman state. Further, he was causing political problems by desiring to have his nephew Marcus Claudius Marcellus follow in his footsteps and eventually assume the principate in his turn, alienating his three greatest supporters: Agrippa, Maecenas, and Livia. He appointed noted republican Calpurnius Piso (who had fought against Julius Caesar and supported Cassius and Brutus) as co-consul in 23 BC, after his choice Aulus Terentius Varro Murena died unexpectedly.

In the late spring Augustus had a severe illness and on his supposed deathbed made arrangements that would ensure the continuation of the principate in some form, while allaying senators' suspicions of his anti-republicanism. Augustus prepared to hand down his signet ring to his favored general Agrippa. However, Augustus handed over to his co-consul Piso all of his official documents, an account of public finances, and authority over listed troops in the provinces while Augustus's supposedly favored nephew Marcellus came away empty-handed. This was a surprise to many who believed Augustus would have named an heir to his position as an unofficial emperor.

Augustus bestowed only properties and possessions to his designated heirs, as an obvious system of institutionalized imperial inheritance would have provoked resistance and hostility among the republican-minded Romans fearful of monarchy. With regards to the principate, it was obvious to Augustus that Marcellus was not ready to take on his position; nonetheless, by giving his signet ring to Agrippa, Augustus intended to signal to the legions that Agrippa was to be his successor and that they should continue to obey Agrippa, constitutional procedure notwithstanding.

Soon after his bout of illness subsided, Augustus gave up his consulship. The only other times Augustus would serve as consul would be in the years 5 and 2 BC, both times to introduce his grandsons into public life. This was a clever ploy by Augustus; ceasing to serve as one of two annually elected consuls allowed aspiring senators a better chance to attain the consular position while allowing Augustus to exercise wider patronage within the senatorial class. Although Augustus had resigned as consul, he desired to retain his consular imperium not just in his provinces but throughout the empire. This desire, as well as the Marcus Primus affair, led to a second compromise between him and the Senate known as the second settlement.

The primary reasons for the second settlement were as follows. First, after Augustus relinquished the annual consulship, he was no longer in an official position to rule the state, yet his dominant position remained unchanged over his Roman, 'imperial' provinces where he was still a proconsul. When he annually held the office of consul, he had the power to intervene with the affairs of the other provincial proconsuls appointed by the Senate throughout the empire, when he deemed necessary.

A second problem later arose showing the need for the second settlement in what became known as the "Marcus Primus affair". In late 24 or early 23 BC, charges were brought against Marcus Primus, the former proconsul (governor) of Macedonia, for waging a war without prior approval of the Senate on the Odrysian kingdom of Thrace, whose king was a Roman ally. He was defended by Lucius Licinius Varro Murena who told the trial that his client had received specific instructions from Augustus ordering him to attack the client state. Later, Primus testified that the orders came from the recently deceased Marcellus. Such orders, had they been given, would have been considered a breach of the Senate's prerogative under the constitutional settlement of 27 BC and its aftermath—i.e., before Augustus was granted imperium proconsulare maius—as Macedonia was a senatorial province under the Senate's jurisdiction, not an imperial province under the authority of Augustus. Such an action would have ripped away the veneer of republican restoration as promoted by Augustus, and exposed his fraud of merely being the first citizen, a first among equals. Even worse, the involvement of Marcellus provided some measure of proof that Augustus's policy was to have the youth take his place as princeps, instituting a form of monarchy – accusations that had already played out.

The situation was so serious that Augustus appeared at the trial even though he had not been called as a witness. Under oath, Augustus declared that he gave no such order. Murena disbelieved Augustus's testimony and resented his attempt to subvert the trial by using his auctoritas. He rudely demanded to know why Augustus had turned up to a trial to which he had not been called; Augustus replied that he came in the public interest. Although Primus was found guilty, some jurors voted to acquit, meaning that not everybody believed Augustus's testimony, an insult to the 'August One'.

The second settlement was completed in part to allay confusion and formalize Augustus's legal authority to intervene in senatorial provinces. The Senate granted Augustus a form of general imperium proconsulare, or proconsular imperium (power) that applied throughout the empire, not solely to his provinces. Moreover, the Senate augmented Augustus's proconsular imperium into imperium proconsulare maius, or proconsular imperium applicable throughout the empire that was more (maius) or greater than that held by the other proconsuls. This in effect gave Augustus constitutional power superior to all other proconsuls in the empire. Augustus stayed in Rome during the renewal process and provided veterans with lavish donations to gain their support, thereby ensuring that his status of proconsular imperium maius was renewed in 13 BC.

Additional powers 
During the second settlement, Augustus was also granted the power of a tribune (tribunicia potestas) for life, though not the official title of tribune. For some years, Augustus had been awarded tribunicia sacrosanctitas, the immunity given to a tribune of the plebs. Now he decided to assume the full powers of the magistracy, renewed annually, in perpetuity. Legally, it was closed to patricians, a status that Augustus had acquired some years earlier when adopted by Julius Caesar. This power allowed him to convene the Senate and people at will and lay business before them, to veto the actions of either the Assembly or the Senate, to preside over elections, and to speak first at any meeting. Also included in Augustus's tribunician authority were powers usually reserved for the Roman censor; these included the right to supervise public morals and scrutinize laws to ensure that they were in the public interest, as well as the ability to hold a census and determine the membership of the Senate.

With the powers of a censor, Augustus appealed to virtues of Roman patriotism by banning all attire but the classic toga while entering the Forum. There was no precedent within the Roman system for combining the powers of the tribune and the censor into a single position, nor was Augustus ever elected to the office of censor. Julius Caesar had been granted similar powers, wherein he was charged with supervising the morals of the state. However, this position did not extend to the censor's ability to hold a census and determine the Senate's roster. The office of the tribunus plebis began to lose its prestige due to Augustus's amassing of tribunal powers, so he revived its importance by making it a mandatory appointment for any plebeian desiring the praetorship.

Augustus was granted sole imperium within the city of Rome in addition to being granted proconsular imperium maius and tribunician authority for life. Traditionally, proconsuls (Roman province governors) lost their proconsular "imperium" when they crossed the Pomerium—the sacred boundary of Rome—and entered the city. In these situations, Augustus would have power as part of his tribunician authority, but his constitutional imperium within the Pomerium would be less than that of a serving consul, which meant that when he was in the city he might not be the constitutional magistrate with the most authority. Thanks to his prestige or auctoritas, his wishes would usually be obeyed, but there might be some difficulty. To fill this power vacuum, the Senate voted that Augustus's imperium proconsulare maius (superior proconsular power) should not lapse when he was inside the city walls. All armed forces in the city had formerly been under the control of the urban praetors and consuls, but this situation now placed them under the sole authority of Augustus.

In addition, the credit was given to Augustus for each subsequent Roman military victory after this time, because the majority of Rome's armies were stationed in imperial provinces commanded by Augustus through the legatus who were deputies of the princeps in the provinces. Moreover, if a battle was fought in a senatorial province, Augustus's proconsular imperium maius allowed him to take command of (or credit for) any major military victory. This meant that Augustus was the only individual able to receive a triumph, a tradition that began with Romulus, Rome's first king and first triumphant general. Lucius Cornelius Balbus was the last man outside Augustus's family to receive this award, in 19 BC. Tiberius, Augustus's eldest stepson by Livia, was the only other general to receive a triumph—for victories in Germania in 7 BC.

Normally during republican times, the powers Augustus held even after the second settlement would have been split between several people, who would each exercise them with the assistance of a colleague and for a specific period of time. Augustus held them all at once by himself and with no time limits; even those that nominally had time limits were automatically renewed whenever they lapsed.

Conspiracy 

Many of the political subtleties of the second settlement seem to have evaded the comprehension of the plebeian class, who were Augustus's greatest supporters and clientele. This caused them to insist upon Augustus's participation in imperial affairs from time to time. Augustus failed to stand for election as consul in 22 BC, and fears arose once again that he was being forced from power by the aristocratic Senate. In 22, 21, and 19 BC, the people rioted in response and only allowed a single consul to be elected for each of those years, ostensibly to leave the other position open for Augustus.

Likewise, there was a food shortage in Rome in 22 BC which sparked panic, while many urban plebs called for Augustus to take on dictatorial powers to personally oversee the crisis. After a theatrical display of refusal before the Senate, Augustus finally accepted authority over Rome's grain supply "by virtue of his proconsular imperium", and ended the crisis almost immediately. It was not until AD 8 that a food crisis of this sort prompted Augustus to establish a praefectus annonae, a permanent prefect who was in charge of procuring food supplies for Rome.

There were some who were concerned by the expansion of powers granted to Augustus by the second settlement, and this came to a head with the apparent conspiracy of Fannius Caepio. Some time prior to 1 September 22 BC, a certain Castricius provided Augustus with information about a conspiracy led by Fannius Caepio. Murena, the outspoken consul who defended Primus in the Marcus Primus affair, was named among the conspirators. The conspirators were tried in absentia with Tiberius acting as prosecutor; the jury found them guilty, but it was not a unanimous verdict. All the accused were sentenced to death for treason and executed as soon as they were captured—without ever giving testimony in their defence. Augustus ensured that the facade of Republican government continued with an effective cover-up of the events.

In 19 BC, the Senate granted Augustus a form of "general consular imperium", which was probably imperium consulare maius, like the proconsular powers that he received in 23 BC. Like his tribune authority, the consular powers were another instance of gaining power from offices that he did not actually hold. In addition, Augustus was allowed to wear the consul's insignia in public and before the Senate, as well as to sit in the symbolic chair between the two consuls and hold the fasces, an emblem of consular authority. This seems to have assuaged the populace; regardless of whether or not Augustus was a consul, the importance was that he both appeared as one before the people and could exercise consular power if necessary. On 6 March 12 BC, after the death of Lepidus, he additionally took up the position of pontifex maximus, the high priest of the college of the pontiffs, the most important position in Roman religion. On 5 February 2 BC, Augustus was also given the title pater patriae, or "father of the country".

Stability and staying power 

A final reason for the second settlement was to give the principate constitutional stability and staying power in case something happened to Princeps Augustus. His illness of early 23 BC and the Caepio conspiracy showed that the regime's existence hung by the thin thread of the life of one man, Augustus himself, who had several severe and dangerous illnesses throughout his life. If he were to die from natural causes or fall victim to assassination, Rome could be subjected to another round of civil war. The memories of Pharsalus, the Ides of March, the proscriptions, Philippi, and Actium, barely twenty-five years distant, were still vivid in the minds of many citizens. Proconsular imperium was conferred upon Agrippa for five years, similar to Augustus's power, in order to accomplish this constitutional stability. The exact nature of the grant is uncertain but it probably covered Augustus's imperial provinces, east and west, perhaps lacking authority over the provinces of the Senate. That came later, as did the jealously guarded tribunicia potestas. Augustus's accumulation of powers was now complete.

War and expansion 

Augustus chose Imperator ("victorious commander") to be his first name, since he wanted to make an emphatically clear connection between himself and the notion of victory, and consequently became known as Imperator Caesar Divi Filius Augustus. By AD 13, Augustus boasted 21 occasions where his troops proclaimed "imperator" as his title after a successful battle. Almost the entire fourth chapter in his publicly released memoirs of achievements known as the Res Gestae is devoted to his military victories and honors.

Augustus also promoted the ideal of a superior Roman civilization with a task of ruling the world (to the extent to which the Romans knew it), a sentiment embodied in words that the contemporary poet Virgil attributes to a legendary ancestor of Augustus: tu regere imperio populos, Romane, memento—"Roman, remember by your strength to rule the Earth's peoples!" The impulse for expansionism was apparently prominent among all classes at Rome, and it is accorded divine sanction by Virgil's Jupiter in Book 1 of the Aeneid, where Jupiter promises Rome imperium sine fine, "sovereignty without end".

By the end of his reign, the armies of Augustus had conquered northern Hispania (modern Spain and Portugal) and the Alpine regions of Raetia and Noricum (modern Switzerland, Bavaria, Austria, Slovenia), Illyricum and Pannonia (modern Albania, Croatia, Hungary, Serbia, etc.), and had extended the borders of Africa Proconsularis to the east and south. Judea was added to the province of Syria when Augustus deposed Herod Archelaus, successor to client king Herod the Great. Syria (like Egypt after Antony) was governed by a high prefect of the equestrian class rather than by a proconsul or legate of Augustus.

Again, no military effort was needed in 25 BC when Galatia (modern Turkey) was converted to a Roman province shortly after Amyntas of Galatia was killed by an avenging widow of a slain prince from Homonada. The rebellious tribes of Asturias and Cantabria in modern-day Spain were finally quelled in 19 BC, and the territory fell under the provinces of Hispania and Lusitania. This region proved to be a major asset in funding Augustus's future military campaigns, as it was rich in mineral deposits that could be fostered in Roman mining projects, especially the very rich gold deposits at Las Médulas.

Conquering the peoples of the Alps in 16 BC was another important victory for Rome, since it provided a large territorial buffer between the Roman citizens of Italy and Rome's enemies in Germania to the north. Horace dedicated an ode to the victory, while the monumental Trophy of Augustus near Monaco was built to honor the occasion. The capture of the Alpine region also served the next offensive in 12 BC, when Tiberius began the offensive against the Pannonian tribes of Illyricum, and his brother Nero Claudius Drusus moved against the Germanic tribes of the eastern Rhineland. Both campaigns were successful, as Drusus's forces reached the Elbe River by 9 BC—though he died shortly after by falling off his horse. It was recorded that the pious Tiberius walked in front of his brother's body all the way back to Rome.

To protect Rome's eastern territories from the Parthian Empire, Augustus relied on the client states of the east to act as territorial buffers and areas that could raise their own troops for defense. To ensure security of the empire's eastern flank, Augustus stationed a Roman army in Syria, while his skilled stepson Tiberius negotiated with the Parthians as Rome's diplomat to the East. Tiberius was responsible for restoring Tigranes V to the throne of the Kingdom of Armenia.

Arguably his greatest diplomatic achievement was negotiating with Phraates IV of Parthia (37–2 BC) in 20 BC for the return of the battle standards lost by Crassus in the Battle of Carrhae, a symbolic victory and great boost of morale for Rome. Werner Eck claims that this was a great disappointment for Romans seeking to avenge Crassus's defeat by military means. However, Maria Brosius explains that Augustus used the return of the standards as propaganda symbolizing the submission of Parthia to Rome. The event was celebrated in art such as the breastplate design on the statue Augustus of Prima Porta and in monuments such as the Temple of Mars Ultor ('Mars the Avenger') built to house the standards. Parthia had always posed a threat to Rome in the east, but the real battlefront was along the Rhine and Danube rivers. Before the final fight with Antony, Octavian's campaigns against the tribes in Dalmatia were the first step in expanding Roman dominions to the Danube. Victory in battle was not always a permanent success, as newly conquered territories were constantly retaken by Rome's enemies in Germania.

A prime example of Roman loss in battle was the Battle of the Teutoburg Forest in AD 9, where three entire legions led by Publius Quinctilius Varus were destroyed by Arminius, leader of the Cherusci, an apparent Roman ally. Augustus retaliated by dispatching Tiberius and Drusus to the Rhineland to pacify it, which had some success although the battle brought the end to Roman expansion into Germany. Roman general Germanicus took advantage of a Cherusci civil war between Arminius and Segestes; at the Battle of Idistaviso in AD 16, they defeated Arminius.

Death and succession 

The illness of Augustus in 23 BC brought the problem of succession to the forefront of political issues and the public. To ensure stability, he needed to designate an heir to his unique position in Roman society and government. This was to be achieved in small, undramatic and incremental ways that did not stir senatorial fears of monarchy. If someone was to succeed to Augustus's unofficial position of power, he would have to earn it through his own publicly proven merits.

Some Augustan historians argue that indications pointed toward his sister's son Marcellus, who had been quickly married to Augustus's daughter Julia the Elder. Other historians dispute this since Augustus's will was read aloud to the Senate while he was seriously ill in 23 BC, indicating a preference for Marcus Agrippa, who was Augustus's second in charge and arguably the only one of his associates who could have controlled the legions and held the empire together.

After the death of Marcellus in 23 BC, Augustus married his daughter to Agrippa. This union produced five children, three sons and two daughters: Gaius Caesar, Lucius Caesar, Vipsania Julia, Agrippina, and Agrippa Postumus, so named because he was born after Marcus Agrippa died. Shortly after the second settlement, Agrippa was granted a five-year term of administering the eastern half of the empire with the imperium of a proconsul and the same tribunicia potestas granted to Augustus (although not trumping Augustus's authority), his seat of governance stationed at Samos in the eastern Aegean. This granting of power showed Augustus's favor for Agrippa, but it was also a measure to please members of his Caesarian party by allowing one of their members to share a considerable amount of power with him.

Augustus's intent became apparent to make Gaius and Lucius Caesar his heirs when he adopted them as his own children. He took the consulship in 5 and 2 BC so that he could personally usher them into their political careers, and they were nominated for the consulships of AD 1 and 4. Augustus also showed favor to his stepsons, Livia's children from her first marriage Nero Claudius Drusus Germanicus (henceforth referred to as Drusus) and Tiberius Claudius (henceforth Tiberius), granting them military commands and public office, though seeming to favor Drusus. After Agrippa died in 12 BC, Tiberius was ordered to divorce his own wife Vipsania Agrippina and marry Agrippa's widow, Augustus's daughter Julia—as soon as a period of mourning for Agrippa had ended. Drusus's marriage to Augustus's niece Antonia was considered an unbreakable affair, whereas Vipsania was "only" the daughter of the late Agrippa from his first marriage.

Tiberius shared in Augustus's tribune powers as of 6 BC but shortly thereafter went into retirement, reportedly wanting no further role in politics while he exiled himself to Rhodes. No specific reason is known for his departure, though it could have been a combination of reasons, including a failing marriage with Julia as well as a sense of envy and exclusion over Augustus's apparent favouring of his young grandchildren-turned-sons Gaius and Lucius. (Gaius and Lucius joined the college of priests at an early age, were presented to spectators in a more favorable light, and were introduced to the army in Gaul.)

After the deaths of both Lucius and Gaius in AD 2 and 4 respectively, and the earlier death of his brother Drusus (9 BC), Tiberius was recalled to Rome in June AD 4, where he was adopted by Augustus on the condition that he, in turn, adopt his nephew Germanicus. This continued the tradition of presenting at least two generations of heirs. In that year, Tiberius was also granted the powers of a tribune and proconsul, emissaries from foreign kings had to pay their respects to him and by AD 13 was awarded with his second triumph and equal level of imperium with that of Augustus.

The only other possible claimant as heir was Agrippa Postumus, who had been exiled by Augustus in AD 7, his banishment made permanent by senatorial decree, and Augustus officially disowned him. He certainly fell out of Augustus's favor as an heir; the historian Erich S. Gruen notes various contemporary sources that state Agrippa Postumus was a "vulgar young man, brutal and brutish, and of depraved character".

On 19 August AD 14, Augustus died while visiting Nola where his father had died. Both Tacitus and Cassius Dio wrote that Livia was rumored to have brought about Augustus's death by poisoning fresh figs. This element features in many modern works of historical fiction pertaining to Augustus's life, but some historians view it as likely to have been a salacious fabrication made by those who had favoured Postumus as heir, or other of Tiberius's political enemies. Livia had long been the target of similar rumors of poisoning on the behalf of her son, most or all of which are unlikely to have been true. Alternatively, it is possible that Livia did supply a poisoned fig (she did cultivate a variety of fig named for her that Augustus is said to have enjoyed), but did so as a means of assisted suicide rather than murder. Augustus's health had been in decline in the months immediately before his death, and he had made significant preparations for a smooth transition in power, having at last reluctantly settled on Tiberius as his choice of heir. It is likely that Augustus was not expected to return alive from Nola, but it seems that his health improved once there; it has therefore been speculated that Augustus and Livia conspired to end his life at the anticipated time, having committed all political process to accepting Tiberius, in order to not endanger that transition.

Augustus's famous last words were, "Have I played the part well? Then applaud as I exit"—referring to the play-acting and regal authority that he had put on as emperor. Publicly, though, his last words were, "Behold, I found Rome of clay, and leave her to you of marble". An enormous funerary procession of mourners traveled with Augustus's body from Nola to Rome, and all public and private businesses closed on the day of his burial. Tiberius and his son Drusus delivered the eulogy while standing atop two rostra. Augustus's body was coffin-bound and cremated on a pyre close to his mausoleum. It was proclaimed that Augustus joined the company of the gods as a member of the Roman pantheon.

Historian D. C. A. Shotter states that Augustus's policy of favoring the Julian family line over the Claudian might have afforded Tiberius sufficient cause to show open disdain for Augustus after the latter's death; instead, Tiberius was always quick to rebuke those who criticized Augustus. Shotter suggests that Augustus's deification obliged Tiberius to suppress any open resentment that he might have harbored, coupled with Tiberius's "extremely conservative" attitude towards religion. Also, historian R. Shaw-Smith points to letters of Augustus to Tiberius which display affection towards Tiberius and high regard for his military merits. Shotter states that Tiberius focused his anger and criticism on Gaius Asinius Gallus (for marrying Vipsania after Augustus forced Tiberius to divorce her), as well as toward the two young Caesars, Gaius and Lucius—instead of Augustus, the real architect of his divorce and imperial demotion.

Legacy 

Augustus created a regime which maintained peace and prosperity in the Roman west and the Greek east for two centuries. Its dominance also laid the foundations of a concept of universal empire in the Byzantine Empire and the Holy Roman Empires down to their dissolutions in 1453 and 1806, respectively. Both his adoptive surname, Caesar, and his title Augustus became the permanent titles of the rulers of the Roman Empire for fourteen centuries after his death, in use both at Old Rome and at New Rome. In many languages, Caesar became the word for emperor, as in the German Kaiser and in the Bulgarian and subsequently Russian Tsar (sometimes Csar or Czar). The cult of Divus Augustus continued until the state religion of the empire was changed to Christianity in 391 by Theodosius I. Consequently, there are many excellent statues and busts of the first emperor. He had composed an account of his achievements, the Res Gestae Divi Augusti, to be inscribed in bronze in front of his mausoleum. Copies of the text were inscribed throughout the empire upon his death. The inscriptions in Latin featured translations in Greek beside it and were inscribed on many public edifices, such as the temple in Ankara dubbed the Monumentum Ancyranum, called the "queen of inscriptions" by historian Theodor Mommsen.

The Res Gestae is the only work to have survived from antiquity, though Augustus is also known to have composed poems entitled Sicily, Epiphanus, and Ajax, an autobiography of 13 books, a philosophical treatise, and a written rebuttal to Brutus's Eulogy of Cato. Historians are able to analyze excerpts of letters penned by Augustus, preserved in other works, to others for additional facts or clues about his personal life.

Many consider Augustus to be Rome's greatest emperor; his policies certainly extended the empire's life span and initiated the celebrated Pax Romana or Pax Augusta. The Roman Senate wished subsequent emperors to "be more fortunate than Augustus and better than Trajan". Augustus was intelligent, decisive, and a shrewd politician, but he was not perhaps as charismatic as Julius Caesar and was influenced on occasion by Livia (sometimes for the worse). Nevertheless, his legacy proved more enduring. The city of Rome was utterly transformed under Augustus, with Rome's first institutionalized police force, firefighting force, and the establishment of the municipal prefect as a permanent office. The police force was divided into cohorts of 500 men each, while the units of firemen ranged from 500 to 1,000 men each, with 7 units assigned to 14 divided city sectors.

A praefectus vigilum, or "Prefect of the Watch" was put in charge of the vigiles, Rome's fire brigade and police. With Rome's civil wars at an end, Augustus was also able to create a standing army for the Roman Empire, fixed at a size of 28 legions of about 170,000 soldiers. This was supported by numerous auxiliary units of 500 non-citizen soldiers each, often recruited from recently conquered areas.

With his finances securing the maintenance of roads throughout Italy, Augustus installed an official courier system of relay stations overseen by a military officer known as the praefectus vehiculorum. Besides the advent of swifter communication among Italian polities, his extensive building of roads throughout Italy also allowed Rome's armies to march swiftly and at an unprecedented pace across the country. In the year 6 Augustus established the aerarium militare, donating 170 million sesterces to the new military treasury that provided for both active and retired soldiers.

One of the most enduring institutions of Augustus was the establishment of the Praetorian Guard in 27 BC, originally a personal bodyguard unit on the battlefield that evolved into an imperial guard as well as an important political force in Rome. They had the power to intimidate the Senate, install new emperors, and depose ones they disliked; the last emperor they served was Maxentius, as it was Constantine I who disbanded them in the early 4th century and destroyed their barracks, the Castra Praetoria.

Although the most powerful individual in the Roman Empire, Augustus wished to embody the spirit of Republican virtue and norms. He also wanted to relate to and connect with the concerns of the plebs and lay people. He achieved this through various means of generosity and a cutting back of lavish excess. In the year 29 BC, Augustus gave 400 sesterces (equal to 1/10 of a Roman pound of gold) each to 250,000 citizens, 1,000 sesterces each to 120,000 veterans in the colonies, and spent 700 million sesterces in purchasing land for his soldiers to settle upon. He also restored 82 different temples to display his care for the Roman pantheon of deities. In 28 BC, he melted down 80 silver statues erected in his likeness and in honor of him, an attempt of his to appear frugal and modest.

The longevity of Augustus's reign and its legacy to the Roman world should not be overlooked as a key factor in its success. As Tacitus wrote, the younger generations alive in AD 14 had never known any form of government other than the principate. Had Augustus died earlier, matters might have turned out differently. The attrition of the civil wars on the old Republican oligarchy and the longevity of Augustus, therefore, must be seen as major contributing factors in the transformation of the Roman state into a de facto monarchy in these years. Augustus's own experience, his patience, his tact, and his political acumen also played their parts. He directed the future of the empire down many lasting paths, from the existence of a standing professional army stationed at or near the frontiers, to the dynastic principle so often employed in the imperial succession, to the embellishment of the capital at the emperor's expense. Augustus's ultimate legacy was the peace and prosperity the Empire enjoyed for the next two centuries under the system he initiated. His memory was enshrined in the political ethos of the Imperial age as a paradigm of the good emperor. Every emperor of Rome adopted his name, Caesar Augustus, which gradually lost its character as a name and eventually became a title. The Augustan era poets Virgil and Horace praised Augustus as a defender of Rome, an upholder of moral justice, and an individual who bore the brunt of responsibility in maintaining the empire.

However, for his rule of Rome and establishing the principate, Augustus has also been subjected to criticism throughout the ages. The contemporary Roman jurist Marcus Antistius Labeo, fond of the days of pre-Augustan republican liberty in which he had been born, openly criticized the Augustan regime. In the beginning of his Annals, Tacitus wrote that Augustus had cunningly subverted Republican Rome into a position of slavery. He continued to say that, with Augustus's death and swearing of loyalty to Tiberius, the people of Rome traded one slaveholder for another. Tacitus, however, records two contradictory but common views of Augustus:

According to the second opposing opinion:

In a 2006 biography on Augustus, Anthony Everitt asserts that through the centuries, judgments on Augustus's reign have oscillated between these two extremes but stresses that:

Tacitus was of the belief that Nerva (r. 96–98) successfully "mingled two formerly alien ideas, principate and liberty". The 3rd-century historian Cassius Dio acknowledged Augustus as a benign, moderate ruler, yet like most other historians after the death of Augustus, Dio viewed Augustus as an autocrat. The poet Marcus Annaeus Lucanus (AD 39–65) was of the opinion that Caesar's victory over Pompey and the fall of Cato the Younger (95 BC–46 BC) marked the end of traditional liberty in Rome; historian Chester Starr writes of his avoidance of criticizing Augustus, "perhaps Augustus was too sacred a figure to accuse directly."

The Anglo-Irish writer Jonathan Swift (1667–1745), in his Discourse on the Contests and Dissentions in Athens and Rome, criticized Augustus for installing tyranny over Rome, and likened what he believed Great Britain's virtuous constitutional monarchy to Rome's moral Republic of the 2nd century BC. In his criticism of Augustus, the admiral and historian Thomas Gordon (1658–1741) compared Augustus to the puritanical tyrant Oliver Cromwell (1599–1658). Thomas Gordon and the French political philosopher Montesquieu (1689–1755) both remarked that Augustus was a coward in battle. In his Memoirs of the Court of Augustus, the Scottish scholar Thomas Blackwell (1701–1757) deemed Augustus a Machiavellian ruler, "a bloodthirsty vindicative usurper", "wicked and worthless", "a mean spirit", and a "tyrant".

Revenue reforms 

Augustus's public revenue reforms had a great impact on the subsequent success of the Empire. Augustus brought a far greater portion of the Empire's expanded land base under consistent, direct taxation from Rome, instead of exacting varying, intermittent, and somewhat arbitrary tributes from each local province as Augustus's predecessors had done. This reform greatly increased Rome's net revenue from its territorial acquisitions, stabilized its flow, and regularized the financial relationship between Rome and the provinces, rather than provoking fresh resentments with each new arbitrary exaction of tribute.

The measures of taxation in the reign of Augustus were determined by population census, with fixed quotas for each province. Citizens of Rome and Italy paid indirect taxes, while direct taxes were exacted from the provinces. Indirect taxes included a 4% tax on the price of slaves, a 1% tax on goods sold at auction, and a 5% tax on the inheritance of estates valued at over 100,000 sesterces by persons other than the next of kin.

An equally important reform was the abolition of private tax farming, which was replaced by salaried civil service tax collectors. Private contractors who collected taxes for the State were the norm in the Republican era. Some of them were powerful enough to influence the number of votes for men running for offices in Rome. These tax farmers called publicans were infamous for their depredations, great private wealth, and the right to tax local areas.

The use of Egypt's immense land rents to finance the Empire's operations resulted from Augustus's conquest of Egypt and the shift to a Roman form of government. As it was effectively considered Augustus's private property rather than a province of the Empire, it became part of each succeeding emperor's patrimonium.

Instead of a legate or proconsul, Augustus installed a prefect from the equestrian class to administer Egypt and maintain its lucrative seaports; this position became the highest political achievement for any equestrian besides becoming Prefect of the Praetorian Guard. The highly productive agricultural land of Egypt yielded enormous revenues that were available to Augustus and his successors to pay for public works and military expeditions.

Month of August 
The month of August (Latin: Augustus) is named after Augustus; until his time it was called Sextilis (named so because it had been the sixth month of the original Roman calendar and the Latin word for six is sex). Commonly repeated lore has it that August has 31 days because Augustus wanted his month to match the length of Julius Caesar's July, but this is an invention of the 13th century scholar Johannes de Sacrobosco. Sextilis in fact had 31 days before it was renamed, and it was not chosen for its length (see Julian calendar).

According to a senatus consultum quoted by Macrobius, Sextilis was renamed to honor Augustus because several of the most significant events in his rise to power, culminating in the fall of Alexandria, fell in that month.

Creation of "Italia"
Roman Italy was established by Augustus in 7 BC with the Latin name "Italia". This was the first time that the Italian peninsula was united administratively and politically under the same name. Due to this act, Augustus was called the Father of Italy by Italian historians such as G. Giannelli.

Building projects 

On his deathbed, Augustus boasted "I found a Rome of bricks; I leave to you one of marble." Although there is some truth in the literal meaning of this, Cassius Dio asserts that it was a metaphor for the Empire's strength. Marble could be found in buildings of Rome before Augustus, but it was not extensively used as a building material until the reign of Augustus.

Although this did not apply to the Subura slums, which were still as rickety and fire-prone as ever, he did leave a mark on the monumental topography of the centre and of the Campus Martius, with the Ara Pacis (Altar of Peace) and monumental sundial, whose central gnomon was an obelisk taken from Egypt. The relief sculptures decorating the Ara Pacis visually augmented the written record of Augustus's triumphs in the Res Gestae. Its reliefs depicted the imperial pageants of the praetorians, the Vestals, and the citizenry of Rome.

He also built the Temple of Caesar, the Baths of Agrippa, and the Forum of Augustus with its Temple of Mars Ultor. Other projects were either encouraged by him, such as the Theatre of Balbus, and Agrippa's construction of the Pantheon, or funded by him in the name of others, often relations (e.g. Portico of Octavia, Theatre of Marcellus). Even his Mausoleum of Augustus was built before his death to house members of his family. To celebrate his victory at the Battle of Actium, the Arch of Augustus was built in 29 BC near the entrance of the Temple of Castor and Pollux, and widened in 19 BC to include a triple-arch design.

After the death of Agrippa in 12 BC, a solution had to be found in maintaining Rome's water supply system. This came about because it was overseen by Agrippa when he served as aedile, and was even funded by him afterwards when he was a private citizen paying at his own expense. In that year, Augustus arranged a system where the Senate designated three of its members as prime commissioners in charge of the water supply and to ensure that Rome's aqueducts did not fall into disrepair.

In the late Augustan era, the commission of five senators called the curatores locorum publicorum iudicandorum (translated as "Supervisors of Public Property") was put in charge of maintaining public buildings and temples of the state cult. Augustus created the senatorial group of the curatores viarum (translated as "Supervisors for Roads") for the upkeep of roads; this senatorial commission worked with local officials and contractors to organize regular repairs.

The Corinthian order of architectural style originating from ancient Greece was the dominant architectural style in the age of Augustus and the imperial phase of Rome. Suetonius once commented that Rome was unworthy of its status as an imperial capital, yet Augustus and Agrippa set out to dismantle this sentiment by transforming the appearance of Rome upon the classical Greek model.

Residences

The official residence of Augustus was the Domus Augusti on the Palatine which he made into a palace after buying it in 41/40 BC. He had other residences such as the horti maecenati in Rome where Augustus preferred to stay whenever he became ill and which Maecenas left to him in his will in 8 BC.  The great villa of Vedius Pollio at Posilipo near Naples was beqeathed (probably forced) to him in 15 BC.

Augustus built the Palazzo a Mare palace on Capri. He also built the immense Villa Giulia on the island of Ventotene as a summer residence early in his reign. The family home of Augustus was probably the villa at Somma Vesuviana, Nola. This was the location where he died and where his father also died.

Physical appearance and official images 

His biographer Suetonius, writing about a century after Augustus's death, described his appearance as: "... unusually handsome and exceedingly graceful at all periods of his life, though he cared nothing for personal adornment. He was so far from being particular about the dressing of his hair, that he would have several barbers working in a hurry at the same time, and as for his beard he now had it clipped and now shaved, while at the very same time he would either be reading or writing something ... He had clear, bright eyes ... His teeth were wide apart, small, and ill-kept; his hair was slightly curly and inclined to golden; his eyebrows met. His ears were of moderate size, and his nose projected a little at the top and then bent ever so slightly inward. His complexion was between dark and fair. He was short of stature, although Julius Marathus, his freedman and keeper of his records, says that he was five feet and nine inches (just under 5 ft. 7 in., or 1.70 meters, in modern height measurements), but this was concealed by the fine proportion and symmetry of his figure, and was noticeable only by comparison with some taller person standing beside him...", adding that "his shoes [were] somewhat high-soled, to make him look taller than he really was". Scientific analysis of traces of paint found in his official statues show that he most likely had light brown hair and eyes (his hair and eyes were depicted as the same color).

His official images were very tightly controlled and idealized, drawing from a tradition of Hellenistic portraiture rather than the tradition of realism in Roman portraiture. He first appeared on coins at the age of 19, and from about 29 BC "the explosion in the number of Augustan portraits attests a concerted propaganda campaign aimed at dominating all aspects of civil, religious, economic and military life with Augustus's person." The early images did indeed depict a young man, but although there were gradual changes his images remained youthful until he died in his seventies, by which time they had "a distanced air of ageless majesty". Among the best known of many surviving portraits are the Augustus of Prima Porta, the image on the Ara Pacis, and the Via Labicana Augustus, which depicts him in his role as pontifex maximus. Several cameo portraits include the Blacas Cameo and Gemma Augustea.

See also 

 Augustan and Julio-Claudian art
 Augustan literature (ancient Rome)
 Propaganda in Augustan Rome
 Bierzo Edict
 Gaius Maecenas
 Indo-Roman trade relations
 Julio-Claudian family tree
 List of Roman emperors
 Temple of Augustus

Notes

References

Sources

Ancient sources

Modern sources

Further reading

External links 

 Works by and about Augustus at Perseus Digital Library
 Gallery of the Ancient Art: August
 The Via Iulia Augusta: road built by the Romans; constructed on the orders of Augustus between the 13–12 B.C.
 Augustan Legionaries – Augustus's legions and legionaries
 Augustus – short biography at the BBC
 Brown, F. The Achievements of Augustus Caesar, Clio History Journal, 2009.
 "Augustus Caesar and the Pax Romana" – essay by Steven Kreis about Augustus's legacy
 "De Imperatoribus Romanis" (archived 17 March 2022) – article about Augustus at Garrett G. Fagan's online encyclopedia of Roman emperors
 Augustus – article by Andrew Selkirk

 
63 BC births
14 deaths
1st-century BC Roman augurs
1st-century BC Roman consuls
1st-century BC rulers in Europe
1st-century Roman emperors
1st-century clergy
Ancient Roman adoptees
Ancient Roman military personnel
Burials at the Mausoleum of Augustus
Characters in Book VI of the Aeneid
Children of Julius Caesar
Deified Roman emperors
Founding monarchs
Julii Caesares
Julio-Claudian dynasty
People in the canonical gospels
Political spokespersons
Pontifices
Roman pharaohs
Shipwreck survivors
1st-century Romans
Octavii